Moodys Crossroads is an unincorporated community in Crenshaw County, Alabama, United States.

In 1924, it was a formal location for voter registration; by 1926, it had a cemetery, and a general store was mentioned in 1932. In 2004, it was still referred to as an inhabited settlement.

Notes

Unincorporated communities in Lowndes County, Alabama
Unincorporated communities in Alabama